Dawn Knowles (born c. 1953, died March 29, 2006; in marriage also known as Dawn Harris) was a Canadian curler.

In 2006, she was inducted into Canadian Curling Hall of Fame together with all of the 1979 Lindsay Sparkes team.

Knolwes was a teacher, and in the late 1970s, she used her knowledge and training to assist in the advancement of curling as one of the first members of the Curl Canada Coaching Program. The first-ever set of curling instructional films was developed in 1980 and Knowles was one of the models used in the six-part series. In 1982, the Canadian Curling Association introduced the National Team Leader Program and Knowles was the first person to assume the role, travelling to the women's world championship with Canada's representative, the team of Colleen Jones, Kay Smith, Monica Jones and Barbara Jones-Gordon.

Teams

References

External links
 

1953 births
2006 deaths
Canadian women curlers
Curlers from British Columbia
Canadian women's curling champions